This list of museums in Scotland contains museums which are defined for this context as institutions (including nonprofit organisations, government entities, and private businesses) that collect and care for objects of cultural, artistic, scientific, or historical interest and make their collections or related exhibits available for public viewing. Also included are non-profit art galleries and university art galleries. Museums that exist only in cyberspace (i.e., virtual museums) are not included. Many other small historical displays are located in the country's stately homes, castles and public libraries.

Museums

Defunct museums
Abbott House, Dunfermline, closed in 2015
Angus Folk Museum, Glamis, closed in 2017 due to structural issues, collections moved to House of Dun
Archaeolink Prehistory Park, Oyne, Aberdeenshire, closed in 2011
Birkhill Fireclay Mine
 Brander Museum, Huntly 
 The Big Idea, Irvine, North Ayrshire, closed in 2003
 Dunaskin Heritage Centre, Dalmellington
 Carnegie Inverurie Museum, Inverurie 
 Garlogie Mill Power House, Garlogie 
 Glasgow Museum of Transport, closed in 2010, collections moving to the Riverside Museum
Glover House, closed in 2006
 Heatherbank Museum of Social Work, Glasgow Caledonian University, closed in 2004, collections now online only
 Inverkeithing Museum
 Jane Welsh Carlyle House, Haddington, East Lothian
 Lochwinnoch Community Museum
Marischal Museum, Aberdeen, closed in 2008, collection items now on display in the King's Museum.
Musselburgh Doll Museum, closed in 2014
Museum of Fire, Edinburgh, closed in 2016 with plans to reopen in 2018 which did not materialise
National Museum of Costume, New Abbey, closed in 2013. Items from the costume collection are now on display in the Art and Design galleries of the National Museum of Scotland.
 Newhaven Heritage Museum, Edinburgh, closed in 2007
 Peter Anson Gallery, Buckie, Moray
 Peterhead Maritime Heritage Centre, Peterhead, closed in 2010  
Pictavia Visitor Centre, Brechin, closed 2014. 
Pittencrieff House Museum, Dunfermline, collections now on display in the Dunfermline Carnegie Library and Galleries  
 Springburn Museum, Springburn, Glasgow
 Weaver's Cottage, Airdrie, North Lanarkshire
 World of Boats, Eyemouth, Owners Eyemouth International Sailing Craft Association (EISCA) entered liquidation in June 2017 and the collection was sold at auction in July 2017.

See also
Museums Galleries Scotland for a list of over 350 museums and galleries around Scotland
Historic Environment Scotland
National Trust for Scotland
List of National Trust for Scotland properties
Tourist attractions in Scotland

References

External links
Visit Scotland
Dumfries and Galloway – Museums and Galleries 
Museums & Galleries of Scotland

Scottish culture
Scotland
 
Lists of buildings and structures in Scotland
Scottish education-related lists
Lists of organisations based in Scotland